Robert Marshall may refer to:
 Robert Marshall (New Brunswick politician) (1832–1904), businessman and politician in New Brunswick, Canada
 Robert Marshall (cricketer, born 1912) (1912–1956), New Zealand cricketer
 Robert Marshall (cricketer, born 1869) (1869–1937), English cricketer
 Robert Marshall (dramatist) (1863–1910), Scots playwright
 Robert Marshall (Irish judge) (1695–1774)
 Robert Marshall (snooker player) (born 1964), English snooker player
 Robert C. Marshall, American football and basketball coach
 Robert Colin Marshall (1883–1962), Calgary mayor and Alberta MLA
 Robert George Marshall (1893-1957), American politician and businessman
 Robert G. Marshall (born 1944), Virginia politician and Member of the Virginia House of Delegates
 Robert I. Marshall (born 1946), American politician in Delaware
 Robert L. Marshall (1913–2008), educationalist
 Robert O. Marshall (1939–2015), American businessman charged with (and later convicted of) the contract killing of his wife, Maria
 Robert Marshall (footballer) (1864–1924), Scottish footballer with Partick Thistle, Rangers, Scotland 
 Robert J. Marshall (1918–2008), American clergyman and religious leader
 Robert Neal Marshall (born 1960), American theatre and television actor
 Robert Marshall (magician), medieval magician's assistant allegedly involved in a plot to kill Edward II of England
 Róbert Marshall (born 1971), Icelandic politician
 Robert Marshall (bowls) (born 1964), Scottish international lawn bowler
 Robert Marshall (writer) (born 1960), American writer, critic and artist
 Robert W. Marshall (born 1959), American priest and bishop

See also
 Rob Marshall (born 1960), American film director and choreographer
 Bob Marshall (disambiguation)
 Bobby Marshall (disambiguation)
 Marshall Owen Roberts
 Marshall Roberts Collection